Anheuser-Busch InBev SA/NV, commonly known as AB InBev, is a Belgian multinational drink and brewing company based in Leuven, Belgium. AB InBev has a global functional management office in New York City, and regional headquarters in São Paulo, London, St. Louis, Mexico City, Bremen, Johannesburg and others. It has approximately 630 beer brands in 150 countries.

AB InBev was formed through InBev (itself a merger between Interbrew from Belgium and AmBev from Brazil) acquiring Anheuser-Busch from the United States.

In October 2015, Anheuser-Busch InBev announced a successful all-cash bid to acquire South African multinational competitor SABMiller; the merger was concluded in October 2016. It was the world's largest brewer even before the acquisition of SABMiller and is considered one of the largest fast-moving consumer goods companies in the world. The annual sales for the company in 2019 were US$52.3 billion; prior to the merger, ABInBev had realized US$45.5 billion in revenue in 2016. The company was expected to have a 28 percent market share of global volume beer sales in 2017, according to Euromonitor International.

The company subsequently sold the former SABMiller's interest in MillerCoors to Molson Coors, sold many of the former SABMiller's European brands to the Japanese beverage corporation Asahi Breweries and sold much of its Coca-Cola bottling and distribution interests to the American beverage group Coca-Cola Company.

Anheuser-Busch InBev SA/NV is a publicly listed company, with its primary listing on the Euronext Brussels. It has secondary listings on Mexico City Stock Exchange, Johannesburg Stock Exchange and New York Stock Exchange.

History 
AB InBev was formed following the merger of American brewer Anheuser-Busch and  Belgian-Brazilian brewer InBev, which in turn is a merger of AmBev and Interbrew. 
 Interbrew was formed in 1987 from a merger of the two largest breweries in Belgium: Artois and Piedboeuf. The Artois brewery, previously known as Den Hoorn, was established by 1366. And, the Piedboeuf brewery established by 1812. In 1995, Interbrew expanded by acquiring Labatt Brewing Company (founded 1847), the largest brewer in Canada. In 2002 it acquired Beck's (founded 1873), the maker of the world's top selling German beer.
 AmBev (short for Companhia de Bebidas das Américas, or "Beverages Company of the Americas") was created in 1999 with the merger of the two biggest Brazilian brewers, Antarctica (founded in 1880) and Brahma (founded in 1886).
 Anheuser-Busch was established in 1852 in St. Louis, Missouri, US as Anheuser & Co.

In 2004, Interbrew and AmBev merged, creating the world's largest brewer, InBev. The deal was valued at $11.5 billion and combined the 3rd largest (Interbrew) and 5th largest (Ambev) brewers into the world's No.1 beermaker. The deal consolidated the top brands from Belgium, Canada, Germany and Brazil.

Anheuser bought Harbin Brewery, the maker of Harbin beer, in 2004 and Fujian Sedrin Brewery, the maker of Sedrin beer, in 2006, making AB InBev the No. 3 brewer in China, the world's largest beer market.

In 2008, the acquisition by InBev of Anheuser-Busch was completed, creating Anheuser-Busch InBev, expanding on InBev's previous status as the world's largest brewer, creating one of the top five consumer products companies in the world. Under the terms of the merger agreement, all shares of Anheuser-Busch were acquired for US$70 per share in cash, for an aggregate of US$52 billion.

In 2013, Anheuser-Busch InBev joined other alcohol producers in signing the International Alliance for Responsible Drinking's producers' commitments, an initiative to reducing harmful drinking.

On 21 July 2017, Anheuser-Busch InBev continued its investment in the non-alcohol beverage sector with the purchase of energy drink company Hiball.

In December 2018, Anheuser-Busch InBev partnered with cannabis producer Tilray to begin researching cannabis infused non-alcoholic beverages with Tilray subsidiary, High Park Company.

Takeovers 
The following is a diagram of AB InBev's major mergers and acquisitions and historical predecessors, produced prior to the acquisition of SABMiller.

Interbrew 

After the merger in 1987, Interbrew acquired a number of local breweries in Belgium. By 1991, the second phase of targeted external growth began outside Belgium. The first transaction in this phase took place in Hungary, followed in 1995 by the acquisition of Labatt, in Canada, and then in 1999 by a joint venture with Sun in Russia.

In 2000, Interbrew acquired Bass and Whitbread in the UK, and in 2001 the company established itself in Germany, with the acquisition of Diebels. This was followed by the acquisition of Beck's & Co., the Gilde Group and Spaten. Interbrew operated as a family-owned business until December 2000. At this point it organized an initial public offering, becoming a publicly owned company trading on the Euronext stock exchange (Brussels, Belgium).

In 2002, Interbrew strengthened its position in China, by acquiring stakes in the K.K. Brewery and the Zhujiang Brewery.

AmBev 

AmBev is a Brazilian beverages company formed in 1999. It has a dominant position in Latin America and the Caribbean region. The subsidiary is listed on B3, the São Paulo stock exchange, and on the New York Stock Exchange.

Anheuser-Busch 

Anheuser-Busch is the largest brewing company in the United States and employs over 30,000 people. It was the world's largest brewing company based on revenue, but third in brewing volume, before the acquisition by InBev announced 13 July 2008. The division operated 12 breweries in the United States and 17 others overseas.

Anheuser-Busch's best-known beers included brands such as Budweiser, the Busch (originally known as Busch Bavarian Beer) and Michelob families, and Natural Light and Ice. The company also produced a number of smaller-volume and specialty beers, nonalcoholic brews like Budweiser Prohibition which made its first appearance in Canadian markets in 2016, malt liquors (King Cobra and the Hurricane family), and flavored malt beverages (e.g., Tequiza).

Anheuser-Busch was also one of the largest theme park operators in the United States with ten parks throughout the United States. In October 2009, AB InBev announced the sale of its Busch Entertainment theme park division to The Blackstone Group for $2.7 billion. The company had been investigating a sale of Busch Entertainment since the merger with AB InBev.

InBev 

InBev was the second largest brewery company in the world. While its core business is beer, the company also had a strong presence in the soft drink market in Latin America. It employed about 86,000 people and was headquartered in Leuven, Belgium, where Anheuser-Busch InBev is based.

Before the merger with AmBev, Interbrew was the third largest brewing company in the world by volume, Anheuser-Busch was the largest, followed by SABMiller in second place. Heineken International was in fourth place and AmBev was the world's fifth-largest brewer.

InBev employed close to 89,000 people, running operations in over 30 countries across the Americas, Europe and Asia Pacific. In 2007, InBev realized 14.4 billion euro of revenue.

Grupo Modelo 
The company owns Grupo Modelo, Mexico's leading brewer and owner of the Corona brand as of 4 June 2013. This transaction was valued at US$20.1 billion. To satisfy US anti-trust demands, Grupo Modelo sold its US business, including US brand rights and the Piedras Negras Brewery in Mexico, for approx. US$4.75 billion to Constellation Brands, a competitor of AB Inbev in some beverage sectors.

Additionally, the group has a 51% controlling stock on Cerveceria Nacional Dominicana through the AmBev division.

Oriental Brewery 
On 1 April 2014, AB Inbev completed the re-acquisition of the Oriental Brewery (OB), which it had sold in July 2009. OB is the largest brewer in South Korea. Its CASS brand is the best-selling beer in South Korea. All beers produced by OB are brewed using rice.

Bud Analytics Lab 
In 2013, AB InBev opened its Bud Analytics Lab in Research Park, University of Illinois at Urbana-Champaign, which develops data research and innovation to solve problems ranging from assortment optimization, social media, and market trends to large scale data initiatives.

Acquisition of SABMiller; formation of Anheuser-Busch InBev SA/NV 

On 13 October 2015, Anheuser-Busch InBev made a bid of £70 billion, (US$107 billion when the deal closed), or £44 per share, for its largest rival, SABMiller, which if approved would give the company a third of the global market share for beer sales and a half of the global profit. The company had previously offered £38, £40, £42.15, £43.50 per share respectively, but each of these had been turned down.

SABMiller accepted the bid in principle, but consummation of the deal required antitrust approval by regulatory agencies. In 2015, the U.S. Department of Justice (DOJ) had agreed to the deal only on the basis that SABMiller "spins off all its MillerCoors holdings in the U.S.—which include both Miller- and Coors-held brands—along with its Miller brands outside the U.S." The entire ownership situation was complicated: "In the United States, Coors is majority-owned by MillerCoors (a subsidiary of SABMiller) and minority-owned by Molson Coors, though internationally it’s entirely owned by Molson Coors, and Miller is owned by SABMiller."

The merger (AB InBev acquisition of SABMiller), closed on 10 October 2016. The new company is called Anheuser-Busch InBev SA/NV (AB InBev), based in Leuven, Belgium and listed on Euronext (Euronext: ABI), with secondary listings on the Mexico (MEXBOL: ABI) and South Africa (JSE: ANH) stock exchanges and with American Depositary Receipts on the New York Stock Exchange (NYSE: BUD).

SABMiller ceased trading on global stock markets and divested itself of its interests in the MillerCoors beer company to Molson Coors.

The new AB InBev entity is the world's largest beer company. Estimated annual sales are US$55 billion and the company will have an estimated global market share of 28 percent, according to Euromonitor International.

As per the agreement with the regulators, the former SABMiller sold to Molson Coors full ownership of the Miller brand portfolio outside of the U.S. and Puerto Rico for US$12 billion. Molson Coors also retained "the rights to all of the brands currently in the MillerCoors portfolio for the U.S. and Puerto Rico, including Redd’s and import brands such as Peroni, Grolsch and Pilsner Urquell." The agreement made Molson Coors the world's third-largest brewer.

In Canada, Molson Coors regained the right to make and market Miller Genuine Draft and Miller Lite from the former SABMiller.
After the formation of Anheuser Busch Inbev SA/NV (AB InBev), the Company owned 630 beer brands including Budweiser and Bud Light, Corona, Stella Artois, Beck's, Leffe, Hoegaarden, Quilmes, Victoria, Modelo Especial, Michelob Ultra, Sedrin, Klinskoye, Sibirskaya Korona, Chernigivske, Cass and Jupiler until some were spun off. Anheuser Busch Company also owns a soft drinks business that has bottling contracts with PepsiCo through its subsidiary, Ambev. In December 2016, Coca-Cola Co. bought many of the former SABMiller's Coca-Cola operations, including those in Africa.

As part of the agreements made with regulators before Anheuser-Busch InBev was allowed to acquire SABMiller, the company sold the Peroni, Meantime and Grolsch brands to Asahi on 13 October 2016.

After acquiring SABMiller, Anheuser-Busch InBev SA/NV agreed on 21 December 2016 to sell the former SABMiller Ltd. business in Poland, the Czech Republic, Slovakia, Hungary and Romania to Asahi Breweries Group Holdings, Ltd. for US$7.8 billion. The deal includes popular brands such as Pilsner Urquell, Tyskie, Lech, Dreher and Ursus.

In August 2017, the company announced the formation of a 50–50 joint venture with Anadolu Efes, by merging both of their operations in Russia—with the entity to be known as AB InBev-Efes. AB InBev owns 24 percent of Anadolu Efes from its SABMiller acquisition, with the joint venture being consolidated in Anadolu Efes books, whilst being treated as an equity investment by AB InBev.

Financial consequences of takeovers 
At the end of 2019, total liabilities amounted to US$95.5 billion. Net debt to normalized EBITDA decreased to 4.0×. Goodwill reached US$128.114 billion, which compares with revenues of US$52.329 billion in 2019. For this deleveraging, the dividend for 2018 in EUR was cut in half compared with 2017.

Financial data

Management team
After the formation of Anheuser-Busch InBev SA/NV on 20 October 2016, the company was to be run by teams of "functional chiefs" and "zone presidents" who reported to AB InBev chief executive officer (CEO) Carlos Brito. All but one of those 19 positions are held by people who were already AB InBev executives before the acquisition of SABMiller. Effective July 2021, Brito stepped down as the CEO of AB InBev after 15 years at the helm. Michel Doukeris, previously CEO of North American business for Anheuser-Busch, succeeded him as CEO.

Ownership
Anheuser-Busch InBev is controlled by Belgian families Vandamme, de Mévius and de Spoelberch, who as of 2015 owned a combined 28.6% of the company, and Brazilian investors Jorge Paulo Lemann, Carlos Alberto Sicupira and Marcel Telles, who owned 22.7% through their private investment firm 3G Capital.

Brands 

AB InBev's brand portfolio includes highly popular beer and soft-drink brands. The company classified its brands as Global Brands, International Brands, and Local Champions. The following are some of the more popular 200 brands for AB InBev prior to the merger with SABMiller on 10 October 2016. The combined AB InBev/SAB Miller entity has approximately 400 beer brands as of January 2017.

Global brands include:

 Budweiser
 Corona
 Stella Artois

International brands include:
 Beck's
 Hoegaarden
 Leffe

Local Champion brands include:

 10 Barrel
 Alexander Keith's
 Aguila
 Atlas
 Balboa
 Báltica Dry
 Becker
 Best Damn Brewing Company
 Blue Point Brewing Company
 Bogotá Beer Company
 Boxing Cat Brewery
 Breckenridge Brewery
 Busch
 Cafri
 Camden Town Brewery
 Cass
 Cerveceria Boliviana Nacional
 Cussy
 Chernigivske
 Paceña
 Huari
 Taquiña
 Ducal
 Dommelsch
 Elysian Brewing Company
 Devils Backbone Brewing Company
 Four Peaks 
 Franziskaner
 Golden Road
 Goose Island
 Guaraná Antarctica
 Harbin Brewery
 Hertog Jan
 Hi-Ball Energy Drinks
 Jupiler
 Karbach
 Кlinskoye
 Kokanee
 Labatt
 Löwenbräu
 Michelob
 Modelo
 Natural
 OB Golden Lager
 Poker
 Premier
 Presidente
 Quilmes
 Rifyey
 Rolling Rock
 Rogan
 Shock Top
 Sibirskaya Korona
 Spaten
 Tolstyak
 Victoria, strong blond Belgian beer
 Volzhanin
 Wicked Weed Brewing
 From the takeover of the Ursus Breweries, Timișoara by SABmiller:
 URSUS
 Timisoreana
 Ciucas
 Stejar
 Azuga
 Peroni Nastro Azzurro
 Grolsch
 Pilsner Urquell

Controversies
In October 2015, the company was investigated by the US Justice Department for buying beer distributors and preventing them from selling the beers of its competitors.

In September 2016, it was reported that AB InBev had paid a $6 million fine to the U.S. Securities and Exchange Commission for violations of bribery laws under the Foreign Corrupt Practices Act and for silencing a whistleblower.

In May 2017, the company was criticized for reportedly engaging in anti-competitive practices after purchasing the entire supply of South African hops from SAB Hop Farms, as part of the SABMiller purchase, and making the hops unavailable to any US craft brewers. Similar anti-competitive claims were also made in association with the company's purchase of Roseville, Minnesota-based Northern Brewer, the biggest homebrew-supply chain in the country, through AB Inbev's venture arm ZX Ventures.

The following month, the company was further criticized for having purchased a stake in the beer rating website RateBeer, leading to concerns that the purchase was a conflict of interest.

In July 2017, the company terminated its contract with "Casa Mia" pizzeria in Munich after the politician Ernst Dill vainly tried to persuade the owner to ban Pegida supporters amongst his guests. The year before Anheuser-Busch InBev already bound the owner of "Casa Mia" by contract to interpose at any sign of political activities. A company spokesperson said that the contract termination was not politically motivated.

In autumn 2018, AB InBev completed deals with Major League Baseball and the NBA which will allow them to use athletes' names and images when advertising. This is the first time in 60 years players will be seen in beer ads. These ads will promote safe drinking.

On 21 March 2019, AB InBev subsidiary Anheuser-Busch was sued for false advertising by rival MillerCoors over a Bud Light commercial that aired during the 2019 Super Bowl. The commercial claimed MillerCoors’ Miller Lite and Coors Light products contain corn syrup, but the lawsuit argues that corn syrup is only used during the brewing process as a fermentation aid and neither beer contains corn syrup. The suit alleges that Anheuser-Busch is using "false and misleading statements" to confuse health-conscious consumers into thinking the beers contain high-fructose corn syrup, which has been linked with obesity. An Anheuser-Busch spokesperson called the lawsuit "baseless" and said it would not deter Bud Light from "providing consumers with the transparency they demand." MillerCoors is seeking an injunction to prevent Bud Light from continuing the ad campaign, as well as a trial by jury and legal fees.

References

External links 

 
 

2008 establishments in Belgium
 
Breweries of Flanders
Beer in Brazil
Food and drink companies established in 2008
Companies listed on Euronext Brussels
Companies based in Leuven
Multinational breweries
Companies in the Euro Stoxx 50
Multinational companies headquartered in Belgium